The Diary is a 1974 Yugoslavian cartoon by acclaimed artist Nedeljko Dragić.

Plot
A man goes walking and gets redrawn as an unconventional (and largely improvised) series of other shapes and figures with nostalgic memories of both the wonders and alienations of life.

See also
Independent animation
Experimental film
Modernist animation

References

External links
 
 Diary on Dailymotion
 Diary on Vimeo

1974 films
Zagreb Film films
Yugoslav animated short films
Croatian animated short films
Animated films without speech
1974 animated films